Alan Moore (born 1953) is an English writer, most famous for his work in comics.

Alan Moore may also refer to:

Alan Moore (drummer) (born 1950), drummer who played for Judas Priest on their album Sad Wings of Destiny
Alan Moore (footballer) (born 1974), Irish footballer
Alan Moore (poet) (born 1960),  Irish writer and poet
Alan Moore (sports administrator) (born 1973), Irish semi-professional football player and sports journalist
Alan W. Moore (born 1951), art historian and activist
Allan Moore (born 1964), Scottish footballer
A. Al Moore (1915–1991), American football player
Alan Moore (war artist) (1914–2015), Australian war artist
Allen F. Moore (1869–1945), U.S. Representative from Illinois
Allen J. Moore (born 1958), American geneticist

See also
Moore (surname)